Futebol Clube Nagarjo, commonly known as Nagarjo is an East Timorese football club based in Dili. The team plays in the Liga Futebol Amadora.

Squad 
Squad list as of August 2020

Head coach: Silvino Soares

Competition records

Liga Futebol Amadora 
2016: 7th place in Groub B Segunda Divisao

Taça 12 de Novembro
2016: 1st Round

References

Football clubs in East Timor
Football